ASPO or Aspo may refer to:

Places 
 Aspö Islands, a group of islands in the Pargas municipality of southern Finland
 Aspö, a village on the islands
 Aspö, Karlskrona, an island outside Karlskrona, Sweden

Organisations 
 American Society of Preventive Oncology, a multidisciplinary learned society dedicated to cancer prevention
 American Society for Psychoprophylaxis in Obstetrics, now known as Lamaze International
 Association of the Scouts of the Penza Oblast (Ассоциация Скаутов Пензенской области), Scouting in Russia
 Association for the Study of Peak Oil, researchers on Peak oil
 Army Space Program Office, United States Army Space and Missile Defense Command
 Apollo Spacecraft Program Office, NASA
 Aspo (company), Finland (:fi:Aspo)
 ASPO Tours, French basketball club (:fr:ASPO Tours (basket-ball))
 Äspö Hard Rock Laboratory, Sweden

Entertainment 
 About Some Precioux Oldies, French band which has toured with Alton Ellis